After Taxes is the second studio album by American rapper Sheek Louch. The album was released on November 8, 2005, by D-Block Records and Koch Records. The album features guest appearances from Jadakiss, Carl Thomas, Fabolous, Beanie Sigel, T.I., Styles P, Redman and Ghostface Killah.

Track listing

Charts

References

2005 albums
Sheek Louch albums
E1 Music albums
Albums produced by Buckwild
Albums produced by Havoc (musician)
Albums produced by the Alchemist (musician)
Albums produced by Rockwilder
D-Block Records albums